Julia Pacata was the daughter of Julius Indus, a 1st-century nobleman of the Gaulish Treveri who helped put down a Gaulish rebellion in 21 and led an auxiliary cavalry unit in the Roman army, the Ala Gallorum Indiana. She married Gaius Julius Alpinus Classicianus, the procurator of Roman Britain from 61 to his death in 65. She buried him in London, and his reconstructed tombstone, which was re-used in the medieval wall of London, is now in the British Museum. There is a copy in the Museum of London Collection which was on display until the Museum closed in 2022, and there is a poor quality copy of the inscription near the site of excavation which is just to the East of Tower Hill Underground Station by the Roman City Wall.

Presuming Julia Pacata lived in London with her husband, she is, with Queens Boudicca and Cartimandua, one of the first named women in Roman Britain.

External links
Tomb of C. Julius Alpinus Classicianus

1st-century Roman women
Celtic women
Ancient Romans in Britain
1st-century Gallo-Roman people
Pacata
Treveri
Women in ancient European warfare